EA Salt Lake was an American video game developer located in Salt Lake City, Utah, United States. It was owned by video game publisher Electronic Arts (EA).

History

EA Salt Lake was founded by the studio's president, Vance Cook, as Headgate Studios in 1992. As a veteran programmer for years at Access Software, the onetime premier developer of golf simulations, Cook had the experience and knowledge of how to create a rewarding golfing experience. Headgate's first product was PentaCalc, a scientific calculator for Windows.

In April 1996 the studio was purchased by Sierra On-Line. Initially, Headgate solely developed golf games published by Sierra, starting with Front Page Sports: Golf. On February 22, 1999 Sierra announced a major restructuring of their company, and sold the rights of the original studio back to Cook as a new corporate entity.

In 2000, Headgate began publishing games through Electronic Arts. Headgate began developing Tiger Woods PGA Tour for the PC based on their existing golf engine. They were assigned by EA to develop the title on PlayStation 2 for the 2007 title, and Microsoft Windows, PlayStation 2 and Wii for the 2008 title.

Headgate developed every Microsoft Windows version of the Tiger Woods PGA Tour EA Sports franchise from 2000 to 2007. Headgate's golf games consistently got high praise from industry reviewers and have won numerous industry awards.

On December 1, 2006, Headgate Studios was acquired by Electronic Arts. Headgate was renamed EA Salt Lake. The studios' focus was redirected to developing games for Nintendo's new console, the Wii.

On July 21, 2010, EA Salt Lake was moved from its home in Bountiful, Utah to a new state-of-the-art facility in downtown Salt Lake City, Utah, United States.

In 2011, EA Salt Lake was moved to the Maxis division of Electronic Arts, where it developed four expansion packs for the life simulation game The Sims 3.

After the last expansion pack for The Sims 3, Into the Future, was released, a restructure to focus on mobile titles took place in January 2014. EA closed down the studio in April 2017.

Games developed

Notes

References

External links

American companies established in 1992
American companies disestablished in 2017
Electronic Arts
Defunct video game companies of the United States
Video game companies established in 1992
Video game companies disestablished in 2017
Video game development companies
Defunct companies based in Utah
1992 establishments in Utah
2017 disestablishments in Utah